Sir Henry Edward Fane Goold-Adams KBE CB CMG (16 May 1860 Jamesbrook, County Cork – 15 April 1935) was an officer in the British Army who gained the rank of Colonel in the Royal Artillery.

Life

He was born at Jamesbrook Hall in County Cork in Ireland a younger son of Richard Wallis Goold-Adams and his wife, Mary Sarah Wrixon-Becher, daughter of Sir William Wrixon-Becher. His older brothers included Hamilton Goold-Adams.

He was appointed to the Ordnance Board in 1910. 

He climbed Paektu Mountain with Alfred Cavendish in 1891, of which he supplied an account published by Cavendish in 1894. Lloyd George appointed Goold-Adams to the post of Comptroller of the Munitions Inventions Department of the Ministry of Munitions.

He served in China during the Boxer Rebellion in 1901 and was Mentioned in Dispatches.

He was promoted to Lt Colonel in 1906 and in 1908 left the Royal Artillery to join the Territorial Army.

In 1916 he was living on Princes Street in Edinburgh and was corresponding with David Lloyd George (in his capacity as Secretary of State for War) regarding body armour for troops during the First World War.

He died in Edinburgh on 15 April 1935 and is buried in Dean Cemetery in the west of the city.

Publications

Korea and the Sacred  White Mountain (1891)

References

1860 births
1935 deaths
Royal Artillery officers
People from County Cork
Irish mountain climbers
British civil servants
Knights Commander of the Order of the British Empire
Burials at the Dean Cemetery